Robert Sympson Jameson (1796 – August 1, 1854) was a lawyer and politician in Upper Canada, and later in the Province of Canada. He served as the first Speaker of the Legislative Council of the Province of Canada from 1841 to 1843.

Early years
He was born at Harbridge in the English county of Hampshire in 1796 and educated in Ambleside. He studied law at the Middle Temple and was called to the English bar in 1823. He practiced in London. He married Anna Murphy, a British author, in 1825. In 1829, he was appointed Puisne judge and Chief Justice of Dominica; his wife remained in England. In 1833, he returned to London after refusing the same post in Tobago.

Upper Canada

He was named Attorney General of Upper Canada in the same year and arrived in York (Toronto) in June. He was elected to the Legislative Assembly of Upper Canada for Leeds in 1834, but his election was later invalidated after an appeal; it was found that Ogle Robert Gowan's Orange supporters had intimidated voters. His wife finally joined him in 1836 but left him after less than a year. In 1837, he was named vice-chancellor of the Court of Chancery. He was appointed to the Legislative Council of the Province of Canada in 1841 and became its first speaker. He served on the councils for King's College and Trinity College. In 1842, he was named chief superintendent of education. He also was a member of literary clubs in Toronto and helped found the Toronto Society of Arts in 1847. In 1850, he retired from the Court and, in 1853, from the Legislative Council.

He died in Toronto in 1854 of tuberculosis and left his possessions to Reverend George Maynard who cared for him at the end of his life.

References
 Biography at the Dictionary of Canadian Biography Online
 

1796 births
1854 deaths
English emigrants to pre-Confederation Ontario
Members of the Legislative Assembly of Upper Canada
Members of the Legislative Council of the Province of Canada
People from New Forest District
People from Ambleside
Treasurers of the Law Society of Upper Canada
British Dominica judges
Upper Canada judges
Attorneys-General of Upper Canada
Immigrants to Upper Canada
Province of Canada judges
Burials at St. James Cemetery, Toronto